The Santa Cruz Institute for Particle Physics (SCIPP) is an organized research unit within the University of California system focused on theoretical and experimental high-energy physics and astrophysics.

Research 
SCIPP's scientific and technical staff are and have been involved in several cutting edge research projects for more than 25 years, in both theory and experiment. The primary focus is particle physics and particle astrophysics, including the development of technologies needed to advance that research. SCIPP is also pursuing the application of those technologies to other scientific fields such as neuroscience and biomedicine. The Institute is recognized as a leader in the development of custom readout electronics and silicon micro-strip sensors for state-of-the-art particle detection systems. This department has several world class faculty. These faculty most often are associated with the Stanford Linear Accelerator Center (SLAC) or the ATLAS project at CERN.

There are many experiments being performed at any time within SCIPP but many center on Silicone Strip Particle Detectors and their properties before and after radioactive exposure.  Also many of the faculty work on monte carlo simulations and tracking particles within particle colliders.   Their most prominent project in recent history has been the development of the Gamma-ray Large Area Space Telescope (GLAST) which searches the sky for Gamma Ray Bursts.

Members 
Notable faculty include:

 Anthony Aguirre, theoretical cosmologist
 Tom Banks, c-discoverer of M(atrix) theory in string theory
 George Blumenthal, astronomer, chancellor of UCSC
 Michael Dine, high-energy theorist, recipient of Sakurai prize, physics department chair
 Howard Haber, theoretical particle physicist, recipient of Sakurai prize
 Piero Madau, recipient of Dannie Heineman Prize for Astrophysics
 Joel Primack, quantum field theorist and cosmologist, director of AstroComputing Center
 Constance Rockosi, chair of astronomy department
 Terry Schalk

References

External links
SCIPP @ UCSC

University of California, Santa Cruz
Theoretical physics institutes
Physics institutes
Institutes associated with CERN